Keewong Parish is a parish of Murray County, New South Wales, a cadastral unit for use on land titles. The southern ends of portions 177, 218, 211, 36, and 38 in the Parish of Keewong form part of the border of the ACT with New South Wales, which is mentioned in the Seat of Government Acceptance Act of 1909.

Part of the parish still is located on the eastern side of the Murrumbidgee. Waterhole creek is the south-western boundary, and Burra Creek the eastern boundary. Guise's Creek and Lobb's Hole Creek were originally the boundaries in the north-west, before that part of the land was transferred to the Commonwealth.

References
Map showing proposed Federal Capital Territory and tenures of land within same, Charles Robt. Scrivener, 22 May 1909 
NSW Dept. of Lands Parish map preservation project

Parishes of Murray County